This is a list of gods and supernatural beings from the Aztec culture, its religion and mythology. Many of these deities are sourced from Codexes (such as the Florentine Codex (Bernardino de Sahagún), the Codex Borgia (Stefano Borgia), and the informants). They are all divided into gods and goddesses, in sections. They also come from the Thirteen Heavens.

Gods

Ahuiateteo 
The Ahuiateteo are gods of excess and pleasure.
Macuilcozcacuauhtli, the god of gluttony.
Macuilcuetzpalin, one of the members of the Ahuiateteo.
Macuilmalinalli, one of the members of the Ahuiateteo.
Macuiltochtli, the god of drunkenness and pulque.
Macuilxochitl, the god of gambling and music and an aspect of Xochipilli.

Stars 
 Centzonmimixcoa, the 400 gods of the northern stars.
 Cuahuitlicac, one of the members of the Centzonmimixcoa. Cuahuitlicac was Coatlicue's son and Huitzilopochtli's brother like the god Tlacahuepan. Cuahuitlicac warned the unborn Huitzilopochtli that Coatlicue's other 400 children were planning to kill her to prevent the birth of Huitzilopochtli. Cuahuitlicac is a god of the northern stars like all of the others from the Centzonmimixcoa.
 Centzonhuitznahua, the 400 gods of the southern stars.

Medicine 
 Patecatl, god of healing and patron god of doctors and peyote. Patecatl is the Centzontotochtin's father.
 Ixtlilton, god of medicine and healing.

Centzontotochtin 
The Centzontotochtin are the 400 gods of pulque.
Ometochtli, leader of the Centzontotochtin.
Tezcatzoncatl
Tlilhua
Toltecatl
Tepoztecatl
Texcatzonatl
Colhuatzincatl
Macuiltochtli

Cinteteo 
The Cinteteo are gods of the maizes associated with the Tianquiztli.
Iztacuhca-Cinteotl, god of the white maize.
Tlatlauhca-Cinteotl, god of the red maize.
Cozauhca-Cinteotl, god of the yellow maize.
Yayauhca-Cinteotl, god of the black maize.
Cinteotl, related god of maize.

Fertility 
 Cipactonal, god of astrology and calendars associated with daytime.
 Huehuecoyotl, god of old-age, origin, and deception. Huehuecoyotl is also the patron of wisdom, related to his tricks and foolishness.
 Huehueteotl, god of old-age and origin.

Ehecatotontli 
The Ehecatotontli are gods of the winds or breezes.
Mictlanpachecatl, god of the north wind.
Cihuatecayotl, god of the west wind.
Tlalocayotl, god of the east wind.
Huitztlampaehecatl, god of the south wind.
Ehecatl, related god of wind. He blows the clouds with his breath to make them move in the first layer of the Thirteen Heavens.
Quetzalcoatl-Ehecatl, the connection of wind and light.

Xiuhtotontli 
The Xiuhtotontli are gods of fire and alternative manifestations or states of Xiuhtecuhtli.
Xiuhiztacuhqui, god of the white fire.
Xiuhtlatlauhqui, god of the red fire.
Xiuhcozauhqui, god of the yellow fire.
Xiuhxoxoauhqui, god of the blue fire.
Xiuhtecuhtli, related god of fire and time. His face is painted with black and red pigment.
Xiuhtecuhtli-Huehueteotl, the connection of old-age and time.

Underworld 
Mictlantecuhtli, god of Mictlan (the Underworld). He is also part of the Thirteen Heavens.
Acolmiztli, god of Mictlan (the Underworld). He is a possible form of Mictlantecuhtli. Acolmiztli is also known as Acolnahuacatl.
Techlotl, god who lived in one of nine layers of the underworld. This deity was associated with owls such as Chalchiuhtecolotl.
Nextepehua, god of the ashes who lived in one of nine layers of the underworld. Nextepehua was Micapetlacalli's husband.
Iixpuzteque, god who lived in one of nine layers of the underworld. Iixpuzteque was Nesoxochi's husband.
Tzontemoc, god who lived in one of nine layers of the underworld. Tzontemoc was Chalmeccacihuatl's husband.
Xolotl, god of death who is associated with Venus and the Evening Star. He is the twin god and a double of Quetzalcoatl. 
Cuaxolotl, god who is assumed to be the female counterpart of Xolotl. Cuaxolotl appears to be a manifestation of Chantico, although there seems to be some conflicting opinions.
Tloque-Nahuaque, experimental god of monotheism.
Ometeotl, transcendent god of duality composed of Ometecuhtli and Omecihuatl.
Ometecuhtli, god of substance.
Tonacatecuhtli, god of sustenance associated with Ometecuhtli.
Piltzintecuhtli, god of the visions. In Aztec mythology, he is associated with Mercury (the planet that is visible just before sunrise or just after sunset) and healing.
Citlalatonac, god of female stars in the Milky Way.
Mixcoatl, god of hunting and old god of hurricanes and storms. Mixcoatl is associated with the Milky Way.
Amhimitl is Mixcoatl's harpoon (or dart), just like Xiuhcoatl is Huitzilopochtli's weapon.
Tonatiuh, a god of the sun. He is also part of the Thirteen Heavens.
Nanauatzin, a god of the sun. Nanauatzin sacrificed himself in a fire so that the sun should continue to shine.
Tecciztecatl, god who represents the male aspect of the moon. Tecciztecatl is the son of Tlaloc and Chalchiuhtlicue.
Tlahuizcalpantecuhtli, god of Venus' dawn and aspect of Quetzalcoatl. He has the longest name. He and Xolotl have Venus as association as symbol of twins.
Xocotl, god of Venus and fire.

Four Tezcatlipocas 
Tezcatlipoca, creator god, lord of darkness, lord of the night, god of battles, and the lord of the North. Tezcatlipoca is also known as the "Smoking Mirror". Tezcatlipoca is the old arch-nemesis of Quetzalcoatl. (Black Tezcatlipoca)
Quetzalcoatl, god of the life, the light and wisdom, lord of the winds and the day, and the lord of the West. Quetzalcoatl is the old arch-nemesis of Tezcatlipoca. Sometimes, Quetzalcoatl was the ruler of the East like Xipe-Totec. He is also the most-googled god in the world. (White Tezcatlipoca)
Xipe-Totec, god of agriculture, fertility, seasons, metalsmiths, and disease, and the lord of the East. Xipe-Totec, once again, was the lord of the East, and Quetzalcoatl was the ruler of the West, but sometimes, they were the other way round and Xipe-Totec was the lord of the West. (Red Tezcatlipoca)
Huitzilopochtli, god of war, sun, human sacrifice, bloodletting, and the lord of the South. (Blue Tezcatlipoca)
Painal, god of battles and Huitzilopochtli's messenger.
Tlacahuepan, god of war in Toltec and Huitzilopochtli's brother.
Tepeyollotl, god of the animals, darkened caves, echoes, and earthquakes. Tepeyollotl is a variant of Tezcatlipoca and is associated with mountains.
Itzcaque, god who represents Tezcatlipoca in his capacity of starting wars for his own amusement.
Chalchiutotolin, god of illness, disorder, and chaos. Chalchiutotolin absolves humans of guilt and overcomes their fate. He is also a variant of Tezcatlipoca.
Ixquitecatl, god of sorcerers. Ixquitecatl is a possible variant of Tezcatlipoca.
Itztlacoliuhqui-Ixquimilli, god of frost, ice, cold, winter, and punishment. Itztlacoliuhqui-Ixquimilli is also the god of objectivity and blindfolded justice. Itztlacoliuhqui-Ixquimilli is a variant of Tezcatlipoca and is associated with the night and the north.
Macuiltotec, god of arsenal. Macuiltotec is mainly associated with weaponry and the rites of warfare. Macuiltotec is a possible variant of Tezcatlipoca.
Itztli, god of stone and sacrifice. Itztli is a variant of Tezcatlipoca and shares his qualities with Itztlacoliuhqui-Ixquimilli.

Ballgame 
 Amapan, one of the deities of the Tlachtli ball court and one of the patron deities of the ballgame Ullamaliztli.
 Uappatzin, one of the deities of the Tlachtli ball court and one of the patron deities of the ballgame Ullamaliztli.

Sacrifice 
 Itzpapalotltotec, god of sacrifice.
 Miquiztlitecuhtli, god of death.
 Tlaloc, god of rain, lightning, and thunder. Tlaloc is associated with fertility and agriculture. Tlaloc pierces the clouds' bellies to make them rain in the first layer of the Thirteen Heavens.
 Tlaloque, gods of rain, weather, and mountains. Tláloc had also been considered the ruler of this motley group.
 Chalchiuhtlatonal, god of water who is related to the goddess Chalchiuhtlicue.
 Atlaua, god of water and protector of archers and fishermen. The Aztecs prayed to Atlaua when there were deaths in water.
 Opochtli, god of fishing and birdcatchers. Apparently, Opochtli is the discoverer of both the harpoon and net.
 Teoyaomiqui, god of flowers and dead warriors.

Earth 
Tlaltecayoa, god who is associated with the round earth.
Cipactli, crocodile god. His name means "crocodile" in Nahuatl. His name is similar to the god Cipactonal.
Itztapaltotec, one of the patrons of the trecena and aspect of Xipe-Totec.
Cinteotl, god of maize.

Art 
 Ppillimtec, god of music and poetry.
 Omacatl, god of feast and joy.
 Chicomexochtli, god of painters.
 Chiconahuiehecatl, a creator god similar to the Tezcatlipocas.
 Coyotlinahual, god of feather-workers.
 Xoaltecuhtli, god of dream.
 Xippilli, god of the verdant fields associated with summer.
 Xochipilli, god of love, art, games, beauty, dance, flowers, maize, fertility, and song.

Travel 
 Yacatecuhtli, god of commerce and bartering and patron god of commerce and travellers, especially business travellers.
 Zacatzontli, god of roads. Zacatzontli can be a protector for merchants.
 Tlacotzontli, god of roads. Tlacotzontli can be a protector for merchants.
 Nappatecuhtli, patron god of mat-makers.
 Cochimetl, god of commerce, bartering, and merchants.

Goddesses

Stars 
Coyolxauhqui, goddess of the moon and leader of the Centzon Huitznahua.
 Cuetlachcihuatl, goddess of the Centzon Mimixcoa.
 Tianquiztli, goddesses of the Pleiades.
 Citlaxoncuilli, goddess of Ursa Major.
 Citlaltlachtli, goddess of Orion.
 Citlalcolotl, goddess of Scorpius.
 Citlalozomahtli, goddess of Cepheus, Ursa Minor, and Draco.
 Citlalmiquiztli, goddess of Sagittarius and Corona Australis.
 Citlalhuitzitzilin, goddess of Columba and Lepus.
 Citlalmazatl, goddess of Eridanus and Fornax.
 Citlalolli, goddess of Leo.
 Citlalcuetzpalli, goddess of Andromeda and Pegasus.
 Citlaltecpatl, goddess of Piscis Austrinus and Crane.
 Citlalxonecuilli, goddess of Auriga and Perseus.
 Citlalicue, goddess of female stars in the Milky Way.
 Metztli, goddess of the moon.

Medicine 
 Mayahuel, goddess of Agave. Mayahuel is also known as the "Woman of the 400 Breasts". Mayahuel is the mother of the Centzontotochtin.

Fertility 
 Oxomoco, goddess of astrology and calendars associated with nighttime.
 Cihuateteo, the benevolent spirits of women who died in childbirth. Cihuateteo were likened to the spirits of male warriors who died in violent conflict, because childbirth was conceptually equivalent to the battles of Aztec culture.
 Tzitzimitl (sg. / Tzitzimimeh, pl.), female deities. As such related to fertility, Tzitzimimeh were associated with the Cihuateteo and other female deities such as Tlaltecuhtli, Coatlicue, Citlalicue, and Cihuacoatl. The leader of the Tzitzimimeh was the goddess Itzpapalotl who was the ruler of Tamoanchan, the paradise where the Tzitzimimeh lived in.
 Cihuateteo, vampire goddesses and also the malevolent spirits who died in childbirth. They lurk in temples or lie in wait at crossroads and are ghastly to behold. 
 Cihuacoatl, goddess of childbirth and picker of souls.
 Coatlicue, goddess of fertility, life, death, and rebirth.
 Chimalma, goddess of fertility, life, death, and rebirth.
 Xochitlicue, goddess of fertility, life, death, and rebirth.
 Itzpapalotl, death goddess, obsidian butterfly, and leader of the Tzitzimimeh.
 Toci, goddess of healing. Toci has also been under the name of "Teteoinnan".
 Temazcalteci, goddess of maternity associated with Toci.
 Quilaztli, aztec patron of midwives. Quilaztli is also known as Coacihuatl (serpent woman), Cuauhcihuatl (eagle woman), Yoacihuatl (warrior woman), and Tzitzimincihuatl (devil woman). These are individual honorary classes for women.
 Tonantzin, goddess who is called "our mother". She is a goddess that can also be any other names (e.g. Mother Earth).
 Teteoinnan, meaning "mother of gods," is another epithet for Tonantzin and many other goddesses.
 Chantico, goddess of fires in the family hearth and volcanoes.

Underworld 
 Mictecacihuatl, goddess of Mictlan (the Underworld). She is also part of the Thirteen Heavens.
Micapetlacalli, goddess of the tomb who lived in one of nine layers of the underworld. Micapetlacalli was Nextepehua's wife.
Nesoxochi, goddess of fear who lived in one of nine layers of the underworld. Nesoxochi was Iixpuzteque's wife.
Chalmeccacihuatl, goddess who lived in one of nine layers of the underworld. Chalmeccacihuatl was Tzontemoc's wife.
 Omecihuatl, goddess of substance.
 Tonacacihuatl, goddess of sustenance associated with Omecihuatl.
 Tianquiztli, goddesses of the Pleiades.
 Citlaxoncuilli, goddess of Ursa Major.
 Citlaltlachtli, goddess of Orion.
 Citlalcolotl, goddess of Scorpius.
 Citlalozomahtli, goddess of Cepheus, Ursa Minor, and Draco.
 Citlalmiquiztli, goddess of Sagittarius and Corona Australis.
 Citlalhuitzitzilin, goddess of Columba and Lepus.
 Citlalmazatl, goddess of Eridanus and Fornax.
 Citlalolli, goddess of Leo.
 Citlalcuetzpalli, goddess of Andromeda and Pegasus.
 Citlaltecpatl, goddess of Piscis Austrinus and Crane.
 Citlalxonecuilli, goddess of Auriga and Perseus.
 Citlalicue, goddess of female stars in the Milky Way.
 Metztli, goddess of the moon.

Sacrifice 
 Itzpapalotlcihuatl, goddess of sacrifice.
 Chalchiuhtlicue, goddess of running water, lakes, rivers, seas, streams, horizontal waters, storms, and baptism.
 Acuecueyotl is Chalchiuhtlicue in disguise, but Acuecueyotl is also the god of rivers.
 Atlatonan, patron goddess of those who are born with physical deformities or for unfortunate Mexica who suffered from open sores. This deity was also thought to be the cause of these ailments. She was impersonated by young virgins.
 Huixtocihuatl, goddess of salt and patron of cultivated foods (including people in the salt trade) who is also part of the Thirteen Heavens.
 Atlacoya, goddess of drought.
 Tzapotlatena, goddess of nature.

Earth 
 Tlaltecuhtli, is the old god/goddess of earth. (changed in the landscape and atmosphere)
Tlalcihuatl, another old goddess of earth. (changed in the landscape and atmosphere)
Coatlicue, goddess of earth.
Tlazolteotl, goddess of lust, carnality, passions and sexual misdeeds that she gives to the Aztecs. Tlazolteotl also forgives them. She is part of the Thirteen Heavens where they are "as lunar phases".
Ixcuiname, goddesses of carnality.
Tiacapan, goddess of sexual passion.
Teicu, goddess of sexual appetite.
Tlaco, goddess of sexual longing.
Xocotzin, goddess of sexual desire.
Chicomecoatl, goddess of agriculture.
Xilonen, goddess of maize to where she has it and is tender due to the maize.
Chicomecoatl-Xilonen, the connection of maize and agriculture. Chicomecoatl is certainly similar to Xilonen, who is sometimes referred to as Chicomecoatl.

Art 
 Ayautheotl, the mysterious and unknown goddess of mist and haze. Ayautheotl is responsible for fame and vanity.
 Xochiquetzal, goddess of fertility, beauty, sexual female power, protection of young mothers, pregnancy, childbirth, and women's crafts.
 Xochitlicue, goddess of growthiness. Xochitlicue is the mother of the twins, Xochiquetzal and Xochipilli.

Travel 
 Malinalxochitl, goddess or sorceress of snakes, scorpions and insects of the desert.
 Ilamatecuhtli, goddess of weavers and patron goddess of weaver guilds.

See also 
 Camaxtli, see Mixcoatl.
 Inaquizcaotl, see Huitzilopochtli.
 Acuecueyotlcihuatl, see Chalchiuhtlicue.
 Acolnahuacatlcihuatl, see Acolmiztli.
 Teteo, see Toci.

References

External links
 Mexicolore
 

Aztec mythology and religion
Aztec